Baycroft School is a special needs secondary school in Stubbington, Hampshire, England, near Fareham and Gosport. 
Baycroft School is a day, community special school for secondary-aged students, who experience learning difficulties and autism.

Baycroft School is in partnership with the Pioneer Teaching Alliance to raise standards and to help students in the local community.

References

External links 
 Baycroft School.

Schools for people on the autistic spectrum
Special schools in Hampshire
Borough of Fareham
Community schools in Hampshire
Autism-related organisations in the United Kingdom
Special secondary schools in England